The Shadow Minister of State at the Cabinet Office is a position in the British Shadow Cabinet, appointed by the Leader of the Opposition. The post was made to shadow the Cabinet Office in the Lords, particularly Minister of State for the Cabinet Office Lord Frost who is also Chief Negotiator of Task Force Europe. The position is also Shadow Minister for EU Relations and the opposite to Frost. It is also the Opposition Cabinet Spokesperson in the Lords The position is currently held by Baroness Chapman of Darlington, Former Labour MP for Darlington and Former Shadow Minister for Exiting the European Union. She was appointed to the role in June 2021 by Keir Starmer.

Shadow Minister of State at the Cabinet Office

See also
 Shadow Cabinet of Keir Starmer
 Shadow Minister for the Cabinet Office

References 

Official Opposition (United Kingdom)
Cabinet Office (United Kingdom)